Convolvulus erubescens, commonly known as blushing bindweed,  or  Australian bindweed, is a perennial herbaceous plant in the family Convolvulaceae that is endemic to Australia.

Description
Convolvulus erubescens has trailing and twining stems and variable leaves, ovate to triangular or arrow-shaped, 25–55 mm long and 2–40 mm wide and may have numerous or occasional hairs. The leaves may end with a small distinct point, rounded or sometimes a broad shallow notch. The leaf edges are smooth at the base becoming lobed or toothed toward the apex with ascending, flattened hairs. The inflorescence consists of 1-3 rosy-pink, white or mauve funnel-shaped flowers, 7–15 mm long, 8–20 mm in diameter, with a pale, greenish throat. Flowering occurs mainly in late spring and early autumn but may flower throughout the year in some locations.

Taxonomy and naming
Convolvulus erubescens was first formally described in 1807 by John Sims and the description was published in Botanical Magazine. The specific epithet (erubescens)  is derived from the Latin meaning  "reddening" or "blushing" possibly referring to the flowers.

Distribution and habitat
Blushing bindweed is found in coastal and subcoastal areas where it inhabits eucalypt forests, the margins of rainforests, grassy woodlands and grasslands. Found growing in all states, and the Northern Territory of Australia.

References

erubescens
Flora of New South Wales
Flora of the Northern Territory
Flora of Queensland
Flora of South Australia
Flora of Tasmania
Flora of Victoria (Australia)
Eudicots of Western Australia